Avishai Raviv (born 8 June 1967) is a former agent of Israel's Shin Bet (Shabak), Israel's domestic intelligence service, whose mission was to monitor the activities of right-wing extremists.  His code name was 'Champagne'.

Biography
Avishai Raviv studied at Tel Aviv University, which expelled him for violent behavior, and later at Bar Ilan University.

Raviv was filmed at a public demonstration with a poster of Israeli prime minister Yitzhak Rabin in an SS uniform prior to Rabin's murder. Raviv allegedly knew of Yigal Amir's plans to assassinate Rabin.

After Rabin was assassinated, the journalist Amnon Abramowitch revealed that Raviv was an agent of the Shabak.

Raviv was brought to trial in 2000 for not preventing Rabin's assassination. Raviv mounted a successful defense on the grounds that he had just been doing his job and events had spun out of control.

References

Living people
1967 births
Assassination of Yitzhak Rabin
Bar-Ilan University alumni
Israeli spies
Tel Aviv University alumni
People of the Shin Bet